Zangakan (also Romanized as Zangakān; also known as Zangagān) is a village in northwestern Iran, in Beradust Rural District, Sumay-ye Beradust District, Urmia County, West Azerbaijan Province. At the 2006 census, its population was 138, in 21 families.

References 

Populated places in Urmia County